Leva Reka is a village in the northern part of Resen Municipality, in North Macedonia, roughly  from the municipal centre of Resen. It has 60 residents. The village of Leva Reka has a mountainous terrain, in the centre of the village runs the river known as Leva Reka. Colloquially Leva Reka means 'left river' in Macedonian.

Demographics
Leva Reka's population, as of the 2002 census, is about one-fifth of the village's 1961 population.

People from Leva Reka 
Spiro Levorečki, member of the Internal Macedonian Revolutionary Organization

References

Villages in Resen Municipality